Cecil is a locality in Cypress County, Alberta, Canada.

Cecil has the name of Cecil Cameron, the wife of a railroad official.

References 

Localities in Cypress County